Prospect College is a vocational college located in Washington, D.C. that offers programs in allied health, computer application software, and electrical trade to residents of Washington, D.C., Maryland, and Virginia. Formerly named Technical Learning Centers, Prospect College was founded in 1997 as a non-degree post-secondary school and is licensed by the D.C. Licensure Commission. Prospect College's current CEO is Dr. Mark Toufanian.

Programs 

Prospect College operates on a Semester Credit System in which 15 lecture hours is equivalent to one semester credit, 30 lab hours is equivalent to one semester credit, and 45 clock hours of work-based activities is equivalent to one semester credit.

Maximum Time Frame 
All students must complete their program of study in a period not exceeding 1.5 times (150%) the normal duration of the program as measured in credit hours attempted. For example, a 36-week long program must be completed within a time window of 54 (36+18) weeks. Periods of approved Leave of Absences (LOA) or other extensions are not considered in the calculation of the Time Limit. In order to graduate, a student must successfully complete 100% of the required Modules and attain a minimum cumulative grade point average (GPA) of 2.0 within the maximum time frame.

Grading System

Minimum Grade Requirements 
Students must be in good academic standing (not on probation), have a passing grade (D or better) in each course contained in their program, and have an overall program grade point average (GPA) of 2.0 or better. In addition, students must maintain an overall attendance of 67% or higher.

Externship 
The Allied Health students in the Medical Assistant, Medical Office Administration, and Medical Billing and Coding programs are required to complete a 170-hour externship at the end of their 7-month training program. These externships are primarily hosted by healthcare facilities and are conducted on a voluntary basis to familiarize students with a health care setting. Externships are coordinated through Prospect College's Career Services Office and include partnerships with Providence Hospital, Medstar Washington Hospital Center, Labcorp, DaVita Dialysis, United Medical Center, and The Kidz NP.

Locations 
The main campus is located at 1220 19th St NW Suite 100 Washington, D.C. 20006.

The DuPont extension campus is located at 1220 19th St NW Suite LL Washington, D.C. 20006.

Both campuses offer the same programs listed above.

Admissions 
Prospect College's admissions policies include:
 All applicants must have a high school diploma or GED.
 Additional academic, financial or assessment test standards may be required by Prospect College or certain government or private sponsoring agencies. Applicants must follow the respective agency’s requirements for sponsorship as applicable. 
 If a prospective candidate does not have a High School Diploma or GED, they can still be enrolled if they take and pass an approved ATB test. Concurrent with enrollment in their training program, the student enrolls in a "Career Pathways Program" (CPP). The CPP program includes academic instruction and education services below the post-secondary level that increases an individual’s ability to: read, write, and speak English and perform mathematics or other activities necessary for the attainment of a secondary school diploma or its recognized equivalent; transition to post-secondary education and training; and obtain employment.

Certifications 
Higher Education Licensure Commission
Nationally Accredited by the Council on Occupational Education
Certified to participate in Title IV Financial Aid programs by the U.S. Department of Education
Authorized to accept student referrals from the Workforce Investment Act (WIA) and the D.C. Vocational Rehabilitation Agency

References

Education in Washington, D.C.
Vocational education in the United States